"" ("The Hymn to Saint Barthelemy") is the unofficial song of the French overseas collectivity of Saint Barthélemy. It was created in 1999 by Michael Valenti, with lyrics by Isabelle Massart Déravin. As a French overseas collectivity, the official national anthem is "La Marseillaise".

Lyrics

References

External links
St. Barthélemy – nationalanthems.info

North American anthems